Mihai Grecu (22 November 1916 – 9 April 1998) was a painter from Moldova. According to Lonely Planet,

Personal Exhibitions in the Republic
1946 – The Union of the Plastic Artists, Chisinau
1958 – The State Art Museum of the MSSR, Chisinau
1963 – The Architect's House, Chisinau
1966 – "Mihai Grecu at 50 years", Chisinau
1969 – The Architect's House, Chisinau
1977 – The State Art Museum of the MSSR, Chisinau
1986 – "Mihai Grecu at 70 years", Chisinau
1992 – Chisinau
1996 – "Mihai Grecu at 80", the National Art Museum of Moldova, Chisinau

Personal Exhibitions Abroad
1965 – Baku, Azerbaijan
1965 – Odessa, the Ukraine
1966 – Cernauti, the Ukraine
1968 – Tallinn, Tartu (Estonia), Riga, Liepaia (Latvia)
1969 – Lvov, the Ukraine
1971 – Moscow, Russian Federation
1973 – Vilnus (Lithuania) and Vologda, Russian Federation
1974 – Erevan (Armenia), Nikolaiev (the Ukraine)
1975 – Leningrad (Saint Petersburg), Russian Federation
1977 – Novosibirsk, Russian Federation
1980 – Odessa, the Ukraine
1989 – Moscow, Russian Federation
1992 – Bacau and Bucharest (Romania)

Decorations
 1960 – The Order "Insigna de Onoare" (The Badge of Honor)
 1972 – The Master of Fine Arts of the MSSR
 1987 – The People's Plastic Artist of the MSSR
 1992 – Order of the Republic (Moldova)

Prizes
 1966 – Golden Medal of the Republican Exhibition of the National Economy of the USSR for the picture "Zi de toamna" (Autumn Day)
 1970 – Golden Medal of the Republican Exhibition of the National Economy of the USSR for the triptych "Istoria unei vieti" (History of a Life)
 1978 – Laureate of the State Prize of the MSSR
 1990 – Laureate of the State Prize of the USSR
 1991 – The Great Prize at the 1st Edition of the "Moldova Art Salons" for, the picture "Omagiu stramosilor" (Homage to the Ancestors), Romania

Works

 Maternity, 1943, paint, 50x34,5
 Woman with a Yellow Headkerchief, 1957, oil on canvas, 93x57
 Turkey (cock), 1969, oil on canvas, 120x120
 Hospitality, 1966–67, oil on canvas, 200x200
 Still-life with Quinces, 1967, oil on canvas, 66x60
 Recruits, 1965, oil on canvas, 131x150
 The Autumn Day, 1964, oil on canvas, 197x116
 The Gates of Orheiul Vechi, 1968 – 1974
 The Cranes Had Gone, 1973, mixed technology, canvas, 120x130
 The Bugeac House, 1982, oil on canvas, 120x130
 Supper in the Field, 1970–1971, oil on canvas, 120x130
 The Old Mill, 1976, oil on canvas, 120x100
 The Girls from Ciadar-Lunga, 1960, oil on canvas, 193x172

References

External links 

 Mihail Grecu
 Mihail Grecu

1916 births
1998 deaths
People from Odesa Oblast
People from Akkermansky Uyezd
Moldovan painters
20th-century Moldovan painters
Recipients of the Order of the Republic (Moldova)